Technological escalation describes the situation where two parties in competition tend to employ continual technological improvements in their attempt to defeat each other.  Technology is defined here as a creative invention, either in the form of an object or a methodology. An example is the mutual escalation seen between e-mail spammers and the programmers of spam filters and other anti-spam techniques. Although escalation is usually meant negatively, if two companies are in an escalating competition to produce the best widget, the consumer benefits because they get a choice between better and better widgets.

See also
 Arms race
 Competition
 Conflict (disambiguation)
 Industrial revolution
 Technological escalation during World War II
 War

References
Notes

Conflict (process)
Military technology
Technological races